"Missing / It's You" is a double-A-sided single by a Japanese American singer Kylee. "Missing" is the second opening theme song for the anime Heroman and also featured in the film Memoirs of a Teenage Amnesiac.

Release history

Track listing
CD single

Personnel

"Missing"
vocals : Kylee
sound produce & all other instruments : CHOKKAKU
vocal arrangement & direction : Naohisa Taniguchi
mix : Toshihiko Miyoshi

"It's You"
vocals : Kylee
sound produce & all other instruments : Naohisa Taniguchi
vocal arrangement & direction : Naohisa Taniguchi
mix : D.O.I

"Just Go"
vocals : Kylee
guitar : masasucks
bass : Chris Chaney
drums : Scott Garrett
produce : Jeff Turzo
engineering & additional production : Jesse Astin
mix : Sean Beavan

Limited edition bonus DVD
"Missing" Music Video
"It's You" Music Video
behind the scenes
Heroman Trailer

Music video
The music video for "Missing" was filmed on Kujūkuri Beach in Chiba, Japan.

References

External links
  by DefStar Records

2010 singles
2010 songs
Song articles with missing songwriters